Maarja-Liis Ilus, sometimes better known by her performing name Maarja (born 24 December 1980) is an Estonian pop musician and presenter. She has represented Estonia in the Eurovision Song Contest twice. She was only 15 when she participated in the 1996 contest.

Discography

Albums
 Maarja-Liis (1996)
 First in Line (1997)
 Kaua veel (1998)
 Heart (1998) (only in Japan)
 City Life (2000)
 Look Around, together with Hinkus (2005)
 Läbi jäätunud klaasi, together with Rein Rannap (2006)
 Homme (2008)
 Jõuluingel (2009)
 Kuldne põld (2012)

Important singles 
 Hold Onto Love (1997)
 First in Line (1998)
 All the Love You Needed (2001)
 He Is Always On My Mind (2003)
 Tulilinnud (2015)
 Nii sind ootan (2015)

Musical theatre
Miss Saigon, Ellen (2002)
The Sound of Music, Maria (2003)
Rent, Maureen Johnson (2004)
Cats, Grizabella (2005)
Evita, Eva Perón (2009)

References

External links

1980 births
Living people
Singers from Tallinn
Estonian pop singers
21st-century Estonian women singers
Estonian musical theatre actresses
Eurovision Song Contest entrants for Estonia
Eurovision Song Contest entrants of 1996
Eurovision Song Contest entrants of 1997
English-language singers from Estonia
20th-century Estonian women singers
Melodifestivalen contestants of 2003